Bolo is a video game initially created for the BBC Micro computer by Stuart Cheshire in 1987, and was later ported by Cheshire to the Apple Macintosh. Although offered for sale for the BBC Micro, this version is now regarded as lost. It is a networked multiplayer game that simulates a tank battlefield.

Name
According to the Bolo Frequently Asked Questions page, "Bolo is the Hindi word for communication. Bolo is about computers communicating on the network, and more importantly about humans communicating with each other, as they argue, negotiate, form alliances, agree strategies, etc."

Another tank game with the same name was created for the Apple II in 1982. In the user manual, Cheshire wrote that this was "an unfortunate coincidence".

Description 

Players are divided into two teams. Each player commands a tank that can be driven around a battlefield within an orthogonal, top-down view. The tank has a cannon, which fires forward, and it carries mines as a secondary weapon, which can be dropped while moving or be placed somewhere on the map. Tanks have a certain amount of "armor" (hit points), which is reduced by enemy shots. A tank is destroyed if its armor reaches zero or if it is driven into the sea.

Cannon ammunition and mines can be refilled by going to a friendly "base". The bases also repair damage to tanks, but this depletes the base's armor. Bases' ammunition and armor regenerate slowly.

The goal of the game is to capture all of the bases on the map. Neutral bases may be captured by driving one's tank over them. Hostile bases can be made neutral again by shooting them until their armor supply is reduced to zero.

Another game element is the "pillbox". Pillboxes are initially neutral and will shoot at any tank that approaches them. Like the supply bases, pillboxes can be shot at until destroyed, after which a player can  restore it, making it friendly. Unlike the bases, pillboxes can be moved around the map by the players.

Inside the tank is an engineer, who places mines and moves pillboxes. The engineer can also perform building tasks, after collecting wood in a forest. The structures that can be built are roads, which speed up travel, and walls, which act as a barrier. The engineer can be killed by enemies while out of the tank.

Networking 
The Macintosh version of Bolo supported up to sixteen concurrent networked players,
using AppleTalk over a Local Area Network,
or UDP over the Internet. All AppleTalk network connection types were supported, including LocalTalk, EtherTalk, TokenTalk, and AppleTalk Remote Access.

References

Further reading

 Andrew Wilson and Stephen Intille, "Programming a Bolo Robot: Recognizing Actions By Example", MIT Media Lab Fall 1995 - this paper describes using Bolo as a system for developing a programming by example system.
 Silberman, S. (1995). O Bolo Mio. NetGuide Magazine, May issue. Archived from on 5 June 2020.

External links 
Bolo home page
Stuart Cheshire, the author of Bolo

BBC Micro and Acorn Electron games
Classic Mac OS games
MacOS games
1987 video games
Linux games
Windows games
Video games developed in the United Kingdom
Multiplayer and single-player video games
Military science fiction video games